Kopua nuimata is a clingfish of the family Gobiesocidae, found only around New Zealand.

References
 

nuimata
Endemic marine fish of New Zealand
Taxa named by Graham Stuart Hardy
Fish described in 1984